Edmund Walter Lopat (originally Lopatynski) (June 21, 1918 – June 15, 1992) was a Major League Baseball pitcher, coach, manager, front office executive, and scout. He was sometimes known as "The Junk Man", but better known as "Steady Eddie", a nickname later given to Eddie Murray. He was born in New York City.

Playing career
A ,  left-hander, Lopat began his playing career in 1937. After seven minor league seasons, he made his major league pitching debut on April 30, 1944, playing for the Chicago White Sox. He was traded to the New York Yankees on February 24, 1948 for Aaron Robinson, Bill Wight, and Fred Bradley. From  to  he was the third of the "Big Three" of the Yankees' pitching staff, together with Allie Reynolds and Vic Raschi. In  he led the AL in both earned-run average and won/lost percentage.

On July 30, 1955, Lopat was traded to the Baltimore Orioles for Jim McDonald and cash, finishing out the season and retiring. Over his 12-year AL career, Lopat won 166 games, losing 112 (.597) with an ERA of 3.21. He was also adept with the bat, compiling a .211 batting average with 5 home runs and 77 runs batted in during his career.

Ned Garver described Lopat's pitching style, writing that he "changed speeds a lot and never really threw an exceptional fastball."

Coaching career
Lopat managed the Triple-A Richmond Virginians for the Yankees from 1956–58, compiling a cumulative record of 226–234 with one playoff berth. He then became a roving pitching coach in the Bombers' farm system in 1959. In , he served one season as the Yankees' MLB pitching coach during Casey Stengel's final campaign as the club's manager. That year produced an American League pennant for the Yankees, but a defeat at the hands of the Pittsburgh Pirates in the World Series.

In  Lopat was tapped to manage the Athletics and continued in this role until June 11, 1964. His 1963 squad finished in eighth place, registering one more victory than it had in 1962. But his 1964 A's were playing only .327 baseball at 17–35 on June 10, when he was replaced by Mel McGaha. His final major league managerial record was 90–124 (.421).

Lopat remained with the Athletics as a senior front office aide to team owner Charlie Finley until the club moved to Oakland after the  season. He then scouted for the Montreal Expos during their early years in Major League Baseball.

Managerial record

Later life
In 1978, Eddie Lopat was inducted into the National Polish-American Sports Hall of Fame  He died at his son's home in Darien, Connecticut, on June 15, 1992. Lopat pitched for five victorious Yankees teams in the World Series, in 1949–53.

References

External links

Baseball Almanac

1918 births
1992 deaths
American League All-Stars
American League ERA champions
American people of Polish descent
Baltimore Orioles players
Chicago White Sox players
Deaths from cancer in Connecticut
Deaths from pancreatic cancer
Greensburg Green Sox players
Jeanerette Blues players
Kansas City Athletics coaches
Kansas City Athletics executives
Kansas City Athletics managers
Little Rock Travelers players
Major League Baseball pitchers
Major League Baseball pitching coaches
Minnesota Twins coaches
Minor league baseball managers
Montreal Expos scouts
New York Yankees coaches
New York Yankees players
Oklahoma City Indians players
People from Hillsdale, New Jersey
Richmond Virginians (minor league) players
Shreveport Sports players
Baseball players from New York City